Kyle Wood (born May 4, 1996) is a Canadian professional ice hockey defenceman who is currently playing for Kunlun Red Star of the Kontinental Hockey League (KHL). Wood was drafted 84th overall by the Colorado Avalanche in the 2014 NHL Entry Draft.

Playing career
Wood played youth hockey in his hometown of Waterloo, Ontario, and was selected in the third round, 57th overall, by the Brampton Battalion of the OHL Priority Selection in 2012.

Wood was selected after the 2013–14 season by the Colorado Avalanche in the 2014 NHL Entry Draft, 84th overall. In his final year of junior eligibility, the Avalanche traded Wood's NHL rights, along with those of Alex Tanguay and Conner Bleackley, to the Arizona Coyotes in exchange for Mikkel Boedker on February 29, 2016.

At the conclusion of the 2015–16 OHL season with the North Bay Battalion, Wood signed a three-year, entry-level contract with the Coyotes on March 27, 2016. This was later revised to an amateur try-out deal, which he made with their AHL affiliate, the Springfield Falcons.

After attending his first training camp with the Coyotes, Wood was reassigned to new AHL affiliate, the Tucson Roadrunners, for the 2016–17 season. In his first pro season, he earned October Rookie of the Month honors by registering points in all games.  He also represented the Roadrunners at the AHL All-Star Classic. Wood finished the season with 13 goals and 40 points in 63 games, earning selection to the AHL All-Rookie Team.

On June 15, 2018, the Coyotes traded Wood to the San Jose Sharks for Adam Helewka. The Sharks re-signed him to a one-year contract on July 12, 2019. 

On August 6, 2019, Wood was traded to the Carolina Hurricanes for Trevor Carrick. After the 2019 training camp, the Canes sent him to the Charlotte Checkers of the AHL for the 2019–20 season where he contributed 3 goals and 5 points in 14 games before being traded, for the fourth time in his professional career, going to the Detroit Red Wings in exchange for Oliwer Kaski on December 12, 2019.

Unable to impress within the Red Wings organization, Wood as an impending restricted free agent was not tendered a qualifying offer by the club and was released to free agency on October 8, 2020. Having played through 5 NHL organizations and unable to feature at top level, Wood left North America to sign his first European contract, agreeing to a one-year contract with second tier German club, Löwen Frankfurt of the DEL2, on November 2, 2020. Regaining his scoring touch from the blueline, Wood contributed with 5 goals and 21 points through 32 regular season games for Frankfurt.

As a free agent, Wood left Germany and opted to continue his European career in the Czech Republic, signing a one-year contract with Rytíři Kladno of the ELH, on July 14, 2021.

Career statistics

Awards and honours

References

External links

1996 births
Living people
Brampton Battalion players
Canadian ice hockey defencemen
Charlotte Checkers (2010–) players
Colorado Avalanche draft picks
HC Kunlun Red Star players
Löwen Frankfurt players
Grand Rapids Griffins players
North Bay Battalion players
Rytíři Kladno players
San Jose Barracuda players
Springfield Falcons players
Tucson Roadrunners players
Sportspeople from Waterloo, Ontario
Ice hockey people from Ontario
Canadian expatriate ice hockey players in the United States
Canadian expatriate ice hockey players in the Czech Republic
Canadian expatriate ice hockey players in Germany
Canadian expatriate ice hockey players in China